Timbalier Bay is a bay in southeastern Louisiana in the United States.

The bay is an inlet of the Gulf of Mexico and lies near New Orleans along the southwestern coast of Lafouche Parish. Timbalier Island lies between Barataria Bay and the Gulf of Mexico.

The United States Navy seaplane tender , in commission from 1946 to 1954, was named for Timbalier Bay.

Notes

References
 (ship namesake paragraph)
Merriam Webster's Geographical Dictionary, Third Edition. Springfield, Massachusetts: Merriam-Webster, Incorporated, 1997. .

Bays of Louisiana
Bodies of water of Lafourche Parish, Louisiana
Bodies of water of Terrebonne Parish, Louisiana